The Dubbo CYMS are an Australian rugby league football team based in Dubbo, New South Wales a city in the Orana Region of New South Wales, Australia and play in the Group 11 Rugby League. The team was founded in 1947 before joining the group XI competition eleven years later.

Notable Juniors

 Isaah Yeo (2014- Penrith Panthers)
 Matt Burton (2019- Penrith Panthers)

See also

List of rugby league clubs in Australia

References

External links

Rugby league teams in New South Wales
Rugby clubs established in 1947
1947 establishments in Australia
Dubbo